WPRL (91.7 FM), is a National Public Radio-affiliated station in Lorman, Mississippi. It primarily features National Public Radio programming, jazz, and gospel music.

External links
 WPRL official website
 

WPRL
Alcorn State University
PRL
Radio stations established in 1970
1970 establishments in Mississippi